Wayne Quinn (born 19 November 1976) is an English former professional footballer who played as a left-back.

Club career

Sheffield United
Quinn started his career at Sheffield United, breaking into their first team in 1997.

Newcastle United
In 2001 Quinn was loaned to Newcastle United, who later purchased him for £800,000. After a difficult time at the club, scoring once against Lokeren in the Intertoto Cup, he was loaned back out to Sheffield United, and then West Ham United before being released on a free transfer in 2004.

Non-league
After Quinn left West Ham United at the age of 28, he did not signed for another professional club. It was reported in the Plymouth Evening Herald that Quinn was offered a trial by English Championship club Plymouth Argyle but declined the opportunity, preferring to play amateur football in Cornwall because of a bad injury which led to surgery.

Quinn played for and managed Penzance along with Gary Marks, and in April 2012 he transferred to Falmouth Town, making his first appearance at centre back in a 1–1 draw at home to Elburton Villa.

He was appointed player-manager of South Western Premier League Division One West club Mousehole in 2013.

International career
Quinn played for England's Under 21 team. He also played for England B in 1998, a result which was a 4–1 England win.

References

Living people
1976 births
English people of Cornish descent
Sportspeople from Truro
English footballers
Footballers from Cornwall
Association football defenders
England B international footballers
England under-21 international footballers
Premier League players
English Football League players
Sheffield United F.C. players
Newcastle United F.C. players
West Ham United F.C. players
Penzance A.F.C. players
Falmouth Town A.F.C. players
Mousehole A.F.C. players